Grazielli "Grazi" Soares Massafera (born 28 June 1982) is a Brazilian actress and former model.

In 2004, Massafera won the Miss Paraná Beauty pageant contest, and represented the state in that year's Miss Brasil contest. She finished third, which earned her the title of "Miss Brasil Internacional", and gave her entry into the Miss International contest, held annually in China. In the international pageant, Massafera did not reach the semi-finals. In 2016, she was nominated for the International Emmy Award for Best Actress for her role in the telenovela Verdades Secretas.

Early life

Big Brother 
In 2005, she took part in the fifth season of the Brazilian version of the reality show Big Brother, known as Big Brother Brasil (BBB). The season was the most-watched season ever. Grazi ended in second, with 40% of the votes.

After BBB 
Grazi became the second Big Brother contestant to become a celebrity (the first one being Sabrina Sato). After the show, she ended up on covers of magazines, had several commercial deals and appeared in events. Commercial deals and magazine cover pictures continued, even after the next Big Brother started.

Right after the show, Grazi signed a 1-year contract with Globo, Brazil's most powerful television channel. To take advantage of her popularity with the audience, she was given a slot as a reporter on Caldeirão do Huck and plans were made for her to become a children's show host on the style of Xuxa.

She also posed nude for Brazilian Playboy in the August 2005 issue. Grazi was one of their highest-paid stars to pose in Playboy. The issue sold twice what a typical edition would sell and was the best-selling cover of 2005.

Career 
She started acting classes at Globo acting department. Her first starring role was in a Renato Aragão 2005 movie: Didi, o Caçador de Tesouros.

At the beginning of 2006 it was revealed that Massafera would get a part in Manoel Carlos next soap, which was an important deal since his soaps are usually the most-watched shows in the country. Initially, she only had a small role on the Rede Globo soap opera, Páginas da Vida, which during its airing was the No. 1 show on Brazilian television, achieving record ratings. However, due to her popularity, her part was expanded, and eventually became one of the main characters of the soap. Her acting was acclaimed by the press and the public alike and she became one of the biggest celebrities in the country. For her acting, she received a Prêmio Contigo as best newcomer and a Prêmio de Imprensa as personality of the year.

Her May 2007 cover of Boa Forma magazine was her 134th cover since 2005.

She participated in the parade of one of the most prestigious Samba schools in Rio Carnival in the 2007 carnival. In Easter she played Maria in the theatrical version of "The Passion of Christ".
Soon after, Massafera visited Portugal where she was also very popular because of her role in Páginas da Vida and shot commercials.

From 2007 to 2008 Massafera starred in the soap Desejo Proibido. In 2008 she was crowned queen of the Copacabana Palace carnival. In 2008 she was given her first starring main role in a soap, Negócio da China.

Filmography

Television

Film 
Didi, o caçador de tesouros (2005) – Ana
Shark Bait (2006) (Brazilian voice dubbing) – Brazilian version
Billi Pig (2012) – Marivalda
Uma Família Feliz (2023) - Eva

Awards and nominations

References

External links 

 

Living people
1982 births
21st-century Brazilian actresses
Brazilian people of Italian descent
Brazilian television actresses
Brazilian female models
Miss International 2004 delegates
Brazilian Muay Thai practitioners
Big Brother (franchise) contestants
People from Paraná (state)
Big Brother Brasil